The Boccia International Sports Federation (BISFed) is the international governing body for the sport of boccia. 

It formally assumed governance of the sport on 1 January 2013 from the Cerebral Palsy International Sports and Recreation Association (CPISRA).

References

Boccia
Paralympic Games
Sports governing bodies by sport